"Subconscious" is a song by American singer Samantha James, released as the second single from her second album, Subconsious.

Music video
A music video was shot for "Subconscious" and was released as a video montage on Samantha James' official Om Records page.

Track listing

References

External links 
 Samantha James on OM Records

2010 singles
2010 songs
Deep house songs
Samantha James songs
Om Records singles
Song recordings produced by Sebastian Arocha Morton